In Greek mythology, Polymedon (Ancient Greek: Πολυμέδων) is a son of king Priam mentioned in Hyginus's Fabulae and the Bibliotheca. His mother's name is unknown.

See also
 List of children of Priam

Notes

Trojans
Children of Priam
Princes in Greek mythology

References 

 Apollodorus, The Library with an English Translation by Sir James George Frazer, F.B.A., F.R.S. in 2 Volumes, Cambridge, MA, Harvard University Press; London, William Heinemann Ltd. 1921. ISBN 0-674-99135-4. Online version at the Perseus Digital Library. Greek text available from the same website.
 Gaius Julius Hyginus, Fabulae from The Myths of Hyginus translated and edited by Mary Grant. University of Kansas Publications in Humanistic Studies. Online version at the Topos Text Project.